Casmena subacuminata is a species of leaf beetle of the Democratic Republic of the Congo, described by Maurice Pic in 1941.

References

Eumolpinae
Beetles of the Democratic Republic of the Congo
Taxa named by Maurice Pic
Beetles described in 1941
Endemic fauna of the Democratic Republic of the Congo